Christophe Beys (1575–1647) was a printer in the Kingdom of France and the Spanish Netherlands. He was a grandson of Christophe Plantin.

Life

Beys was born in Paris on 18 June 1575, the son of Gilles Beys and Magdalena Plantin. In 1583 he was sent to his grandfather, Christopher Plantin, in Antwerp. He was trained as a printer at the Plantin Press and was educated at the Jesuit college. In May 1595 he succeeded his father as head of the Paris branch of the Plantin office.

In 1600 he was sued for debt by his father-in-law, Adrien Périer. On 6 April 1601 he lost his status as a sworn printer. In 1608 he opened a new business in Rennes, where he was to become involved in a witchcraft case the following year. Via Dinan he fled to Saint-Omer, where he worked as a bookbinder for the English College Press. His wife and his apprentice, Lambert Foncq, joined him there with what had been salvaged of the Rennes printing shop. In 1610 Beys set up shop in Lille. In 1628 his daughter Georgine married Simon Le Francq, who also became a printer-bookseller in Lille.

Beys died in Lille, sick and in poverty, on 7 September 1647.

Works
Floris Van der Haer, Les Chastelains de Lille (1611) Available on Google Books
Jean-Baptiste Gramaye, Flandria Franca (1612) Available on Google Books
L'Heureux progrez des Armes Imperialles (1625) Available on Google Books
Coustumes et usages de la ville, taille, banlieue et eschevinage de Lille (1629) Available on Google Books

References

1575 births
1647 deaths
Printers from Paris
Artists from Lille
People accused of witchcraft
17th-century printers
Witch trials in France
17th-century French businesspeople